Southern Society was an American magazine published from 1867 to 1868, in Baltimore. According to Frank Luther Mott, it had "a list of superior contributors".

References

Defunct magazines published in the United States
Agricultural magazines
Magazines established in 1867
Magazines disestablished in 1868
1867 establishments in the United States
Mass media in Baltimore
Magazines published in Maryland